The West End  is a wholly unincorporated area in suburban Miami-Dade County, Florida, United States. It is the collection of communities within and adjacent to County Commission District 11. At the time of the 2010 census, there were 213,839 residents.

Geography 
The West End's boundaries are the Florida Turnpike to the east, Southwest 152nd Street to the south, Krome Avenue to the west and Tamiami Trail (Southwest 8th Street) to the north. The area includes the census designated areas of The Hammocks, Country Walk, Kendall West, Kendale Lakes, Three Lakes, The Crossings and Tamiami.

Demographics
In 2015 Commissioner Juan C. Zapata submitted a report called "West End Strategy: A Vision for the Future", which stated that West End residents account for 8.6% of Miami-Dade County's population. It is the second most populous district behind Commission District 9. The West End had a 20.4% growth from 2000 to 2010. It has an annual growth rate of 0.9%. Since 2011, there has been an increase in new residents who have immigrated to the West End from abroad. 
The area has the lowest overall poverty rate of all districts in Miami-Dade County.  Only 7.7% of the West End population lives below poverty level.  This number has been decreasing since 2000. The West End also enjoys a low crime rate.

Government and Infrastructure 
There are five branches of the Miami-Dade County Public Library System that are spread out over the West End.  The Miami-Dade Police Department operates the West District Station located in The Hammocks.  Recreational space is varied and abundant with 35 parks in the area.

Education 
Miami-Dade County Public Schools has 17 elementary schools, five middle schools, five high schools and one K-8 center in the West End. Florida International University and Nova Southeastern University  have campuses in the West End.

Elementary schools
 Dr. Bowman Foster Ashe PLC
 Dr. Gilbert Porter PLC
 Oliver Hoover PLC
 Christina M. Eve Elementary School
 Claude Pepper Elementary School
 Dante B. Fascell Elementary School
 Dr. Bowman Foster Ashe Elementary
 Dr. Carlos J. Finlay Elementary
 Dr. Gilbert L. Porter Elementary
 Dr. Manuel Barreiro Elementary
 Greenglade Elementary School
 Jack D. Gordon Elementary School
 Joe Hall Elementary School
 Kendale Lakes Elementary School
 Oliver Hoover Elementary School
 Wesley Matthews Elementary School
 Zora Neale Hurston Elementary 
 Jane S. Roberts K-8 Center

Middle schools
W.R. Thomas Middle School
Hammocks Middle School
Lamar Louise Curry Middle School
Jorge Mas Canosa Middle School
Zelda Glazer Middle School

High schools
Archbishop Coleman F. Carroll High
Felix Varela High School
G. Holmes Braddock High School
John Ferguson High School
Sunset High School

Academies
Pinecrest Academy South Charter
Pinecrest Preparatory Academy
Pinecrest Preparatory Middle-High

Universities
Nova Southeastern University

Institutions 
West Kendall Baptist Hospital  is part of Baptist Health South Florida. It opened in 2011 and provides medical and surgical services for patients that includes a critical care unit.

West End is home to a large population of seniors and as such has a varied supply of senior centers.

 Oasis Adult Care Corporation
 Nana's Adult Day Care and Recreation Center
 Montano Miriam-Visiting Angels Living Assistance 
 Garden Hills Retirement Center
 Sunrise Community
 Senior Lift Center
 Moya Jenny-Mount Olympus Senior Care and Activity Center
 Olga Martinez Senior Center

Transportation 
There are 13 bus routes provided by Miami-Dade County Transit throughout the West End. 
Miami Executive Airport is a public airport in the southwest of the West End. It is operated by the Miami-Dade Aviation Department and serves corporate and  recreational aircraft. The airport also operates a flight training school and serves governmental agency activities. It also serves as the airbase for the Miami-Dade County Police Aviation Unit and houses Miami-Dade College's aviation programs. The Wings Over Miami Air Museum is located within the airport.

Places of interest
The West End has a variety of attractions to offer its residents and visitors alike. 
 Bark Park
 Zoo Miami
 Wings over Miami

 Kendall Ice Arena
 X-treme Rock Climbing
 Butterfly Garden at Kendale Lakes Library
 Shark Valley Visitor Center
 Splash Pad at Westwind Lakes Park
 The Frost Museum at FIU

National Parks 
 Big Cypress National Preserve
 Everglades National Park
 Gator Park
 Shark Valley Visitor Center

Innovation District 

The Innovation District  is an area within the West End focused around the Miami Executive Airport. The area is projected to become mixed-use with a focus on innovation and technology. Because the West End has the highest concentration of the professional workforce in Miami-Dade County, the plan will attract more professional jobs to the area and provide a stable workforce of professionals who will live and work in the West End.

West End Living App 
The first commission district to have their own app. Download The West End Living app  today for the latest West End news. The app provides information on community events, local businesses, parks and libraries near you, 311 direct, transit tracker, and more exclusive deals.

West End Community Image 
The West End community image, created by artist Stephen Gamson, features a whimsical depiction of an outdoor family scene highlighting the area's unique character and proximity to the Everglades. Miami-Dade County Commissioner Juan C. Zapata is unveiling a colorful new community image to promote the West End as a place for fun families, friendly neighbors, and fit residents.

"The image encompasses our community identity by emphasizing our beautiful parks, family-friendly neighbors and being a gateway to the Everglades," Commissioner Zapata said.

The image will appear on all branded District 11 materials as well as on display stickers that will be distributed to West End businesses and constituents. It also will be featured in the new West End Living mobile app.

Stephen Gamson is an internationally acclaimed American artist of the Communication Age. His unique style is easily recognized for bold colors, iconic symbols and mass appeal.

In addition to the community image, the West End has recently become the first community in the state of Florida to wrap a Florida Power and Light utility box. The design featured on the wrapping is by local artist Michelle Weinberg.

Annual Events 
Holiday Magic features food trucks, bounce houses and other entertainment in the evening. It takes place from November to January.  
West End also hosts movie nights once a month every month from October through May. 
The West End Art Fair is a free event that features live entertainment, food trucks and activities for children.  The main feature is the exhibition of artwork by local artists.  Student artwork from local schools is also showcased.

References 

Geography of Miami-Dade County, Florida
Miami-Dade County, Florida
South Florida
Unincorporated communities in Miami-Dade County, Florida
Unincorporated communities in Florida